This page documents confirmed tornadoes from August to September 2020 via various weather forecast offices of the National Weather Service. Based on the 1991–2010 averaging period, 83 tornadoes occur across the United States throughout August, while 74 occur in September.

A significant number of tornadoes in both months came from the tropics. August had 180 tornadoes, which was well above average, with 55 of them coming as a result of Hurricanes Isaias and Laura. In contrast, September saw only 38 tornadoes, which was well below average, with 23 of them coming from Hurricane Sally and Tropical Storm Beta.

United States yearly total

August

August 1 event

August 2 event

August 3 event

August 4 event
 
This excludes the tornadoes in the Dakotas and Colorado.

August 6 event

August 7 event

August 8 event

August 9 event

August 10 event

August 11 event

August 13 event

August 14 event

August 15 event

August 16 event

August 18 event

August 19 event

August 21 event

August 22 event

August 23 event

August 26 event
Event was associated with Hurricane Laura.

August 27 event
The events in Arkansas were associated with Hurricane Laura.

August 28 event
The events in the Southeast were associated with Hurricane Laura.

August 29 event

August 30 event

August 31 event

September

September 1 event

September 3 event

September 5 event

September 7 event

September 16 event
Events were associated with Hurricane Sally.

September 17 event
Events were associated with Hurricane Sally.

September 18 event
Event was associated with Hurricane Sally.

September 25 event
Event in South Carolina was indirectly associated with Tropical Storm Beta.

September 29 event

See also
 Tornadoes of 2020
 List of United States tornadoes from May to July 2020
 List of United States tornadoes from October to December 2020

Notes

References 

2020-related lists
Tornadoes of 2020
Tornadoes
Tornadoes
2020 natural disasters in the United States
Tornadoes in the United States